Pere Alberch Vie (2 November 1954, Badalona – 13 March 1998, Madrid) was a Spanish naturalist, biologist and embryologist. He was a professor at Harvard University from 1980 to 1989, and director of the Museo Nacional de Ciencias Naturales, Madrid. He studied in the United States, earning a bachelor's degree from the University of Kansas (1976) and a PhD from the University of California, Berkeley (1980).

Biography 
In 1976 he graduated after studying Biology and Environmental Sciences at the University of Kansas. Four years later he obtained a PhD in Zoology at the University of California. Between 1980 and 1989 he worked as both a biology professor at Harvard University and as a curator of herpetology at the Museum of Comparative Zoology. He worked as an editor for magazines such as Trends in Ecology and Evolution (since 1993), Biodiversity Letters (since 1992), Journal of Theoretical Biology (since 1985) and Journal of Evolutionary Biology (1986-1991). In 1989 he returned to Spain as a research professor for the Spanish National Research Council and carried out an important role as director of the Museo Nacional de Ciencias Naturales. In 1998 the Cavanilles Institute of Biodiversity and Evolutional Biology, a new research center located in Valencia, was interested in including Alberch to its staff. He died on March 13, 1998, at the age of 43.

Works

References

 

Embryologists
Extended evolutionary synthesis
Spanish biologists
1954 births
1998 deaths
People from Badalona
University of California, Berkeley alumni
University of Kansas alumni
Harvard University faculty
Directors of museums in Spain
Evolutionary biologists
Biologists from Catalonia
Herpetologists
20th-century Spanish zoologists